The following lists notable events that occurred and which took place during 2017 in Sri Lanka.

Incumbents
 President – Maithripala Sirisena
 Prime Minister – Ranil Wickremesinghe
 Chief Justice – K. Sripavan

Governors
 Central Province – Niluka Ekanayake 
 Eastern Province – Austin Fernando (until 1 July); Rohitha Bogollagama (starting 4 July)
 North Central Province – P. B. Dissanayake 
 Northern Province – Reginald Cooray 
 North Western Province – Amara Piyaseeli Ratnayake 
 Sabaragamuwa Province – Marshal Perera 
 Southern Province – Hemakumara Nanayakkara 
 Uva Province – M. P. Jayasinghe
 Western Province – K. C. Logeswaran

Chief Ministers
 Central Province – Sarath Ekanayake 
 Eastern Province – Ahamed Nazeer Zainulabdeen (until 30 September); vacant thereafter (starting 30 September)
 North Central Province – Peshala Jayarathne (until 1 October); vacant (starting 1 October)
 Northern Province – C. V. Vigneswaran 
 North Western Province – Dharmasiri Dassanayake
 Sabaragamuwa Province – Maheepala Herath (until 26 September); vacant (starting 26 September)
 Southern Province – Shan Wijayalal De Silva 
 Uva Province – Chamara Sampath Dassanayake 
 Western Province – Isura Devapriya

Holidays
Below is a list of bank holidays, public holidays and full moon Poya Days in Sri Lanka for the year 2017.
 12 January – Duruthu Full Moon Poya Day
 14 January – Tamil Thai Pongal Day
 4 February – National Day
 10 February – Navam Full Moon Poya Day
 24 February – Mahasivarathri Day
 12 March – Madin Full Moon Poya Day
 10 April – Bak Full Moon Poya Day
 13 April – Day prior to Sinhala & Tamil
 14 April – Sinhala & Tamil New Year Day
 14 April – Good Friday
 1 May
Labour Day
May Day
 10 May – Vesak Full Moon Poya Day
 11 May – Day Following Vesak Full Moon
 8 June – Poson Full Moon Poya Day
 26 June – Id-Ul-Fitr (Ramazan Festival Day)
 8 July – Esala Full Moon Poya Day
 7 August – Nikini Full Moon Poya Day
 1 September – Id-Ul-Alha (Hadji Festival Day)
 5 September – Binara Full Moon Poya Day
 5 October – Vap Full Moon Poya Day
 18 October – Deepavali Festival Day
 3 November – Ill Full Moon Poya Day
 1 December – Milad-Un-Nabi (Holy Prophet's Birthday)
 3 December – Unduvap Full Moon Poya Day
 25 December – Christmas Day

Deaths

January
 14 January
Deepal Silva, 50 (singer)
M. V. Balan, 75 (actor)
 15 January – H. S. Perera, 68 (actor)
 21 January – Roy Peiris, 54 (singer)

February
 1 February – Baptist Fernando, 83 (actor)
 10 February
Dr. Ariyadasa Pieris, 91 (journalist)
Wimal J. Sagara, 84 (singer)
 13 February – S. A. Francis, (singer)
 14 February – Boniface Fernando, 83 (actor)

March
 10 March – Gamini S. Fernando
 16 March – Pushpa Janet, (actress)
 26 March – Anton Alwis, 73 (scriptwriter)
 27 March – Shantha Kadiragonna

April
 2 April – Vivienne de Silva Boralessa, 86 (songstress)
 3 April – Davuldena Gnanissara Thero, 101 (Buddhist monk).
 8 April – Vasantha Obeysekera, 79 (filmmaker).
 14 April – Dr. Jagath Wijenayake, 60 (film producer)
 15 April – T. Arjuna, 75 (filmmaker)

May
 4 May – Satsorupavathy Nathan, 80 (radio personality).
 5 May – Prabha Ranatunge, 81 (radio personality)
 11 May – Premaranjith Tilakaratne, 80 (dramatist)
 23 May – Daniel Muthumala (actor)
 25 May – Siri Gunasinghe, 92 (academic)
 29 May – Ananda Wedisinghe, 46 (motor cycle champion)
 30 May – Sunil Mihindukula, 56 (journalist)

June
 8 June – Prince Udaya Priyantha, 46 (singer)
 11 June – Anil Mihiripenna, 83 (musician)
 23 June – D. B. Kuruppu, (author)

July
 11 July – Nihal Samarasinghe, (musician)
 14 July – Dr. Thilokasundari Kariyawasam, 88 (educationist)
 17 July – Somapala Rathnayake, 69 (musician)
 20 July – Thilak Atapattu, (film producer)
 26 July – Daya Kahawala, (author)

August
 1 August – Dayawansa Karunamuni, (journalist)
 16 August – Kumari Manel, 76 (actress)
 20 August – Binoy Surendra, 76 (journalist)
 24 August – Narawila Patrick, (author)

September
 20 September
Sumith Bibile, 87 (actor)
Berty Galahitiyawa, 80 (announcer)
Dasun Nishan, 29 (actor)
 23 September – Amaradasa Weerasinghe, (film critique)

October
 20 October
D. A. Balasuriya, (actor)
Senaka Titus Anthony, (actor)

November
 1 November – Suvineetha Fernando, (actress)
 21 November – Dhammika P. Rathnayake, (announcer)
 28 November – Ruwan Weerasekara, 51 (violinist)
 30 November – Newton Gunasekara, (writer)

References

Years of the 21st century in Sri Lanka
 
2010s in Sri Lanka
Sri Lanka
Sri Lanka